"Boy" is a song by Australian singer Emma Louise, released on 7 June 2012 as the lead single from Emma Louise's debut studio album vs Head vs Heart.
 
The song won the Emma Louise the award for Most Popular Female at the 2013 Queensland Music Awards.

Music video
The music video premiered on 19 June 2012 It was produced and directed by Alex Barnes and Silver Screen Pictures.

Reception
Natalie Salvo from Life Music Media opined it sat "somewhere between the pleasant, classic pop of Fleetwood Mac and the interesting layers that peppered Pajama Club's sound" with music that "accentuates Louise’s amazing and versatile voice."
 
Beat Magazine said "Boy is a warm, low-key tune with a dense landscape of synth notes and a metronomic rhythm" before calling the song "nice."
 
Purple Sneakers said "It's a song you can't help but fall in love with" saying "Her hushed vocal tones have the presence of Florence and the Machine and the delicacy of Bat For Lashes."

References

 
Emma Louise songs
2012 singles
2012 songs